The Elizabeth Morgan Act is an act of the 104th United States Congress that was declared unconstitutional in 2003 by the U.S. Court of Appeals for the District of Columbia as being a bill of attainder, because it was written to deny rights to a specific father based on his child's own assertion. It was passed as a rider of the Department of Transportation and Related Agencies Appropriations Act, 1997.

Background
In 1985 Washington, DC plastic surgeon Dr. Elizabeth Morgan accused her ex-husband, dentist Dr. Eric Foretich, of sexually abusing their daughter Hilary, then two years old. Morgan, who had primary custody of the child, then attempted to have Foretich's visitation rights revoked. After a police investigation was unable to substantiate Morgan's claims, a judge ordered her to allow the child to visit her father without supervision. When Morgan refused to do so, she was held in contempt of court and was indefinitely detained in August 1987. While in jail, Morgan refused to reveal the whereabouts of her daughter, who was living with Morgan's parents in New Zealand.

In 1989, Representative Frank Wolf of Virginia introduced the bill that became the District of Columbia Civil Contempt Imprisonment Limitation Act. That legislation removed the provision of District of Columbia law that permitted indefinite detention for civil contempt. While the bill did not mention Morgan or Foretich by name, its authors admitted that it was specifically intended to free Morgan from jail. After being detained for 25 months, Morgan was released from jail shortly after the act was passed into law in September 1989, and subsequently moved to New Zealand to join her parents and her daughter.

Wolf again involved himself in the case when he co-sponsored the 1996 rider bill that became the Elizabeth Morgan Act.  The new law was narrowly worded to apply to the circumstances of Morgan's daughter, allowing the child in those circumstances to refuse consent to custody or visitation by her father, and preventing the District of Columbia courts from issuing custody or visitation orders or sanctions against Morgan.  Having the protection of the 1996 Congressional act, Morgan and her daughter then returned to the United States.

The father, Dr. Eric Foretich, sued against the effect of the act in 1997.  On December 16, 2003, the act was overturned by the U.S. Court of Appeals for the District of Columbia, who ruled that the law was so narrowly written that it targeted Foretich and treated him as a danger to his child without formal charges, illegally punishing him.  The law was moot and had no practical effect on the daughter, who was by then 21 and could choose for herself whether or not to see her father.

See also
A Mother's Right: The Elizabeth Morgan Story
Jonathan Turley
Palm Sunday Compromise

References

Acts of the 104th United States Congress
Child custody
United States federal child welfare legislation
United States federal immigration and nationality legislation
United States federal legislation articles without infoboxes
Riders to United States federal appropriations legislation